Beimerstetten is a municipality in the district of Alb-Donau in Baden-Württemberg in Germany.

References

Alb-Donau-Kreis
Württemberg